Omayra Ortega is an American mathematician, specializing in mathematical epidemiology. Ortega is an assistant professor of mathematics & statistics at Sonoma State University in Sonoma County, California, and the president of the National Association of Mathematicians (NAM).

Early life and education 
Ortega was born in Far Rockaway, Queens, New York. Her parents are originally from Panama.

Omayra Ortega received Bachelor's degrees in mathematics and music from Pomona College in 2001. She pursued graduate studies at the University of Iowa, where she earned a Master's degree in 2005 and a PhD in 2008, both in the "Applied Mathematics & Computational Science" program, as well as a Master's in Public Health degree in 2005. Her dissertation was on mathematical epidemiology, titled "Evaluation of Rotavirus models with coinfection and vaccination"; her advisers were Herbert W. Hethcote and Tong Li.

Career 
In 2006 Ortega became an instructor of applied mathematics at Arizona State University and was promoted to assistant professor after she received her PhD in 2008. In 2017 Ortega became a visiting assistant professor of mathematics at her undergraduate institution Pomona College. In 2018 she became an assistant professor of mathematics and statistics at Sonoma State University. She is currently an Associate Professor and Assistant Dean of Research and Internships in the School of Science and Technology. 

Ortega became the president of the National Association of Mathematicians, NAM, on February 1, 2021. Previously, she was the editor-in-chief of the NAM editorial board to the Mathematical Association of America MathValues blog, as well as editor of the NAM Newsletter. and chair of the NAM Publicity and Publications Committee from 2018-2021.

Ortega has been featured in the PBS show SciGirls.

Awards and recognition 
In 2020 Ortega was named an Association for Women in Mathematics Service Award recipient. She was also recognized by Mathematically Gifted & Black as a Black History Month 2020 Honoree.

Personal life 
Ortega trains in Capoiera.

References

External links 
 Omayra Ortega's Professional Website
 Meet a Mathematician! video interview

Living people
21st-century American mathematicians
African-American mathematicians
American women mathematicians
African-American women academics
American women academics
African-American academics
Pomona College alumni
Pomona College faculty
Year of birth missing (living people)
21st-century American women
21st-century African-American women
21st-century African-American people